Worcestershire sauce, also called Worcester sauce, is a fermented liquid condiment invented in the city of Worcester in Worcestershire, England, during the first half of the 19th century. The inventors were the pharmacists John Wheeley Lea and William Henry Perrins, who went on to form the company Lea & Perrins.

Worcestershire sauce has been a generic term since 1876, when the English High Court of Justice ruled that Lea & Perrins did not own a trademark for the name "Worcestershire".

Worcestershire sauce is frequently used to augment recipes such as Welsh rarebit, Caesar salad, Oysters Kirkpatrick, and devilled eggs. As both a background flavour and a source of umami (savoury), it is now also added to dishes that historically did not contain it, such as chili con carne and beef stew. It is also used directly as a condiment on steaks, hamburgers, and other finished dishes, and to flavour cocktails such as the Bloody Mary and Caesar.

History
A fermented fish sauce called garum was a staple of Greco-Roman cuisine and of the Mediterranean economy of the Roman Empire, as the first-century encyclopaedist Pliny the Elder writes in his Historia Naturalis and the fourth–fifth-century Roman culinary text Apicius includes garum in its recipes. The use of similar fermented anchovy sauces in Europe can be traced back to the 17th century.

The Lea & Perrins brand was commercialised in 1837 and was the first type of sauce to bear the Worcestershire name. The origin of the Lea & Perrins recipe is unclear. The packaging originally stated that the sauce came "from the recipe of a nobleman in the county". The company has also claimed that "Lord Marcus Sandys, ex-Governor of Bengal" encountered it while in India with the East India Company in the 1830s, and commissioned the local pharmacists (the partnership of John Wheeley Lea and William Perrins of 63 Broad Street, Worcester) to recreate it. However, neither Lord Marcus Sandys nor any Baron Sandys was ever a Governor of Bengal, nor had they ever visited India.

According to company tradition, when the recipe was first mixed the resulting product was so strong that it was considered inedible and the barrel was abandoned in the basement. Looking to make space in the storage area a few years later, the chemists decided to try it again, and discovered that the long fermented sauce had mellowed and was now palatable. In 1838, the first bottles of Lea & Perrins Worcestershire sauce were released to the general public.

Ingredients 
The original ingredients in a bottle of Worcestershire sauce were:

 Barley malt vinegar
 Spirit vinegar
 Molasses
 Sugar
 Salt
 Anchovies
 Tamarind extract
 Shallots (later replaced by onions)
 Garlic
 Spices
 Flavourings

Since many Worcestershire sauces include anchovies, it is avoided by those who are allergic to fish, and others who avoid eating fish, such as vegetarians. The Codex Alimentarius recommends that prepared food containing Worcestershire sauce with anchovies include a label warning of fish content, although this is not required in most jurisdictions. The US Department of Agriculture has required the recall of some products with undeclared Worcestershire sauce. Several brands sell anchovy-free varieties of Worcestershire sauce, often labelled as vegetarian or vegan. Generally, Orthodox Jews refrain from eating fish and meat in the same dish, so they do not use traditional Worcestershire sauce to season meat. However, certain brands are certified to contain less than 1/60 of the fish product and can be used with meat.

Although soy sauce is used in many variations of the Worcestershire sauce since the 1880s, it is debated whether Lea & Perrins has ever used soy in their preparation. According to William Shurtleff's SoyInfo Center, a 1991 letter from factory general manager J. W. Garnett describes the brand switching to hydrolyzed vegetable protein during World War II due to shortages. As of 2021, soy is not declared as an ingredient in the Lea & Perrins sauce.

Varieties

Lea & Perrins 

The Lea & Perrins brand was commercialised in 1837 and continues to be the leading global brand of Worcestershire sauce.

On 16 October 1897, Lea & Perrins relocated manufacturing of the sauce from their pharmacy in Broad Street to a factory in the city of Worcester on Midland Road, where it is still made. The factory produces ready-mixed bottles for domestic distribution and a concentrate for bottling abroad.

In 1930, the Lea & Perrins operation was purchased by HP Foods, which was in turn acquired by the Imperial Tobacco Company in 1967.  HP was sold to Danone in 1988 and then to Heinz in 2005.

U.S. version of Lea and Perrins 
The U.S. version is packaged differently from the British version, coming in a dark bottle with a beige label and wrapped in paper. Lea & Perrins USA claims this practice is a vestige of shipping practices from the 19th century, when the product was imported from England, as a measure of protection for the bottles. The producer also claims that its Worcestershire sauce is the oldest commercially bottled condiment in the U.S.  The ingredients in the US version of Lea And Perrins also differ somewhat, in that the US version uses distilled white vinegar as opposed to the malt vinegar used by the UK and Canadian versions.

Brazil and Portugal 

Costa Rica 

Denmark 

El Salvador 

Germany 
A sweeter, less salty version of the sauce called  was developed in the beginning of the 20th century in Dresden, Germany, where it is still being produced. It contains lower amounts of anchovies. It is mostly consumed in the eastern part of the country.

Mexico 

United Kingdom, Australia 
Holbrook's Worcestershire was produced in Birmingham, England, from 1875 but only the Australian subsidiary survives.

United States 
Lea & Perrins Worcestershire Sauce is sold in the United States by Kraft Heinz following the Kraft & Heinz merger in 2015.

Other leading Worcestershire sauce brands in the United States include French's, which was introduced in 1941.

Venezuela 

Non-fish variations 
Some "Worcestershire sauces" are inspired by the original sauce but have deviated significantly from the original taste profile, most notably by the exclusion of fish.

Thailand 

 Worcestershire sauce has been produced since 1917. It relies on soy sauce instead of anchovies for the umami flavour. The company makes two versions: Formula 1 for Asian taste, and Formula 2 for international taste. The two differ only in that Formula 2 contains slightly less soy sauce and slightly more spices.

Japan 
Many sauces are more of a vegetarian variety, with the base being water, syrup, vinegar, puree of apple and tomato puree, and the flavour less spicy and sweeter.

Tonkatsu sauce is a thicker Worcester-style sauce associated with the dish . It is a vegetarian sauce made from vegetables and fruits.

China, Hong Kong, Taiwan 

Worcestershire sauce has a history of multiple introduction in Chinese-speaking areas. These sauces, each differently named, have diverged both from the original and from each other:

 Spicy soy sauce, Shanghai
 Worcestershire sauce was first produced under this name in 1933 by Mailing Aquarius, then an English-owned company. With Mailing moving to Hong Kong in 1946, the Shanghai branch was nationalised in 1954. Sauce production was transferred to Taikang in 1960. The sauce was reformulated in 1981 under a "nine flavours in one" formula, and again changed in 1990 into two "Taikang Yellow" and "Taikang Blue" varieties. As of 2020, only the yellow variety remains available.
 The Taikang Yellow sauce contains no fish. It is highly aromatic yet basically devoid of umami flavour. It is used in Haipai cuisine, especially on pork chops and Shanghainese borscht.
 A descendant of an earlier form of the sauce is found in Taiwan as "Mailing spicy soy sauce", originally produced by the HK branch of Mailing. It is found in steakhouses.
 Gip-sauce, Hong Kong
 This variety is of uncertain etymology: it may have come from catsup or the verb give. Save for the Lea & Perrins original sold as a gip-sauce, most varieties of this type have a stronger umami flavour with the addition of soy sauce, fish sauce, and/or MSG; some commercial varieties forgo fish altogether. This sauce is commonly used in dim sum dishes such as steamed meatball and spring rolls.
 Spicy vinegar, Taiwan
 This variety is descended from the Japanese Worcester Sauce via the Kongyen company, originally founded by Japanese businesspeople. It is also known under the name Taiwan Black Vinegar due to confusion post-WW2.

See also 

 A.1. Steak Sauce
 Anglo-Indian cuisine
 Fish sauce
 French's
 Henderson's Relish – similar sauce without fish
 List of sauces
 Sarson's

References

External links

 , abetted by Lea & Perrins, reports and debunks the myth, without unveiling Lady Sandys.
 .
 Song "Worcestershire Sauce"  written for a "Ballad Documentary" put on by the Somers Folk Club (Malvern) in 1984

1837 introductions
British condiments
Sauce

Sauce
Fermented foods
Fish sauces
History of Worcester, England
Umami enhancers
Japanese condiments
Food brands of the United Kingdom
Steak sauces
Anchovy dishes
Sour foods